ExpressBus is a Finnish express coach network covering most of Finland. It is a joint marketing brand of 3 coach operators and it was launched in 1991. The fleet has around 100 coaches with a white base colour and a red-blue arrow. The current ExpressBus operators are Länsilinjat, Paunu and Pekolan liikenne. Many of the departures also carry Matkahuolto bus cargo in addition to passengers.

References

External links 
ExpressBus

Bus companies of Finland
Bus transport brands